Spencer Platt (born March 16, 1970) is an American photojournalist.

Since 2001, he has documented conflicts for Getty Images in the Republic of Congo, Afghanistan, Liberia, Iraq, Ukraine and many other countries. At the end of the 2006 Lebanon War he photographed five young Lebanese driving through the rubble of the bombed South Beirut in a cabriolete. This image was named World Press Photo of the Year 2006. He was co-winner of the 2022 Pulitzer Prize for breaking news photography.

He was born in Darien, Connecticut.

References

External links 

 

1970 births
Clark University alumni
American photojournalists
War photographers
Living people
Pulitzer Prize for Photography winners